Marked Men is a 1940 American film directed by Sam Newfield (using the pseudonym "Sherman Scott") for Producers Releasing Corporation.

The film is also known as Desert Escape in the USA (TV title).

Plot 
Bill Carver (Warren Hull) is a man wrongfully imprisoned after being framed by gangster Joe Mallon (Paul Bryar). In prison he is involuntarily involved in a jailbreak, also arranged by Mallon, who is serving in the same facility.

The attempted break fails, and Mallon and his gang are soon caught by the police and put back behind bars—except for Bill, who escapes to  the Arizona  desert  and  picks  up a  stray  dog he names Wolf. In the small town of Tempe, he meets Linda (Isabel Jewell) who  offers  him  work  with  her  father, Dr James Prentiss Harkness (John Dilson). Bill stays with the doctor, but then there is another jailbreak at the prison, this time a successful one.

The escapees hold up a bank and make it look as though  Bill was involved in the robbery. He has to clear his name of being part of the bank raid, and the only way he can do this is by catching the real perpetrators, Mallon and his men. He leaves his safe haven at the doctor's house and starts tracking the gang through the desert. Soon he finds Mallon and the others, who are lost  and need Bill's help to find the border and cross into Mexico. He agrees to help them, seeing his chance of clearing his name, but the journey becomes a living hell for them all. Because of the lack of water and the dangers in the desert at night, only Bill, his dog and Mallon

remain when they come close to the border, as during the trek he has brutally killed his henchmen for arguing with him when trying to quench their thirst from the dwindling supplies they are carrying. At this point  Bill forces the weak and starving gangster to sign a written confession, proving his innocence.

As Mallon finishes signing the document, Dr Harkness and his daughter arrive to rescue them. The gangster tries to kill Bill, but he is rescued by his dog. A free man, he returns to  live in peace with the doctor and Linda, whom he marries.

Cast 
Warren Hull as Bill Carver
Isabel Jewell as Linda Harkness
John Dilson as Dr James Prentiss Harkness
Paul Bryar as Joe Mallon
Charles Williams as Charlie Sloane
Lyle Clement as Marshal Dan Tait
Budd Buster as Mr Marvin - Druggist
Al St. John as Gimpy - a Thug
Eddie Fetherston as Marty - a Thug
Ted Erwin as Mike - a Thug
Art Miles as Blimp - a Thug
Grey Shadow as Wolf - the Dog

References

External links 

1940 films
1940 crime films
American black-and-white films
Films directed by Sam Newfield
Producers Releasing Corporation films
American crime films
1940s English-language films
1940s American films